Victor Vicas (25 March 1918 – 9 December 1985) was a Russian-born French film director and screenwriter. His film The Wayward Bus was entered into the 7th Berlin International Film Festival. Between 1974 and 1983 he directed all thirty six episodes of the French TV series The Tiger Brigades.

Selected filmography

 Dreams That Money Can Buy (1947, director: Hans Richter) - cinematographer
 No Way Back (1953) - director
 A Double Life (1954) - director
 Master of Life and Death (1955) - director
 I'll Get Back to Kandara (1956) - director
 The Wayward Bus (1957) - director
 Count Five and Die (1957) - director
 Amour de poche (1957, director: Pierre Kast) - actor
  (1959) - director
 Jons und Erdme (1959) - director
 Two Among Millions (1961) - director; co-director: Wieland Liebske
 Stop Train 349 (1963, director: Rolf Hädrich) - translation to English
 Jack and Jenny (1963)

References

External links

 Victor Vicas Collection at Deutsches Filminstitut, Frankfurt (German website)

1918 births
1985 deaths
French film directors
French male screenwriters
20th-century French screenwriters
French cinematographers
20th-century French male writers
Soviet emigrants to France